The 1951 Stanley Cup playoffs, the playoff tournament of the National Hockey League (NHL), began with four teams on March 28, 1951. It concluded on April 21, with the Toronto Maple Leafs defeating the Montreal Canadiens to win the Stanley Cup.

Series
All dates in 1951

The second seed Toronto Maple Leafs eliminated the fourth seed Boston Bruins in five games, and the third seed Montreal Canadiens upset first overall Detroit Red Wings in six, setting up a Leafs – Canadiens Stanley Cup final series, won by the Leafs 4–1.

Semi-finals
Montreal Canadiens vs. Detroit Red Wings

Boston Bruins vs. Toronto Maple Leafs

Finals

Montreal Canadiens vs. Toronto Maple Leafs

Playoff bracket

Player statistics

Scoring leaders
Note: GP = Games played; G = Goals; A = Assists; Pts = Points

See also
List of Stanley Cup champions

References

playoffs
Stanley Cup playoffs